Rakel Logadóttir (born 22 March 1981) is an Icelandic footballer who plays for Valur. Rakel has played for Iceland's national team and competed in UEFA Women's Euro 2009.

Achievements 
Six times Icelandic champion (2004, 2006, 2007, 2008, 2009 and 2010).
Five times Icelandic cup winner (2003, 2006, 2009, 2010 and 2011).

Honours 
Most Promising Player in Valur in 1998
Player of the Year in Valur in 1999

References

1981 births
Living people
Rakel Logadottir
Rakel Logadottir
Women's association football midfielders
Rakel Logadottir
Rakel Logadottir